Aurelio Cestari (born 16 June 1934) is an Italian former cyclist. He competed in the individual and team road race events at the 1956 Summer Olympics.

References

External links
 

1934 births
Living people
Italian male cyclists
Olympic cyclists of Italy
Cyclists at the 1956 Summer Olympics
Cyclists from the Province of Padua